Koji Sugeno (born 24 August 1981) is a Japanese wheelchair tennis player. At the 2020 Summer Paralympics, he and Mitsuteru Moroishi won bronze medals for Japan in the quad doubles event. Sugeno also finished 4th in the quad singles event. He was born in Ageo and resides in Tokyo.

References

External links 
 
 

1981 births
Living people
Japanese male tennis players
Wheelchair tennis players
Paralympic wheelchair tennis players of Japan
Paralympic bronze medalists for Japan
Paralympic medalists in wheelchair tennis
Medalists at the 2020 Summer Paralympics
Wheelchair tennis players at the 2020 Summer Paralympics
20th-century Japanese people
21st-century Japanese people